Vlčatín is a municipality and village in Třebíč District in the Vysočina Region of the Czech Republic. It has about 200 inhabitants.

Geography
It lies in the Křižanov Highlands. The  Oslavička Stream flows through the municipality.

History
The first written mention of Vlčatín is from 1296, when it was part of the Okarec estate. A stronghold located on the Hradisko hill above the village was destroyed by the army of Jan Žižka.

Transport
Vlčatín is located on the local railway line Studenec–Křižanov.

Sights
The main landmark of Vlčatín is the Chapel of the Immaculate Conception of the Virgin Mary. It was built in 1910.

References

External links

Villages in Třebíč District